Sintel The Game is a video game, developed using Blender based on the Blender Foundation movie Sintel.

Plot 
The game centers on a teenage girl named Sintel who is searching for a dragon she befriended in childhood. In this game Sintel has come across Garway and its corrupt guards. She helps the residents rise up against these guards. The game includes her journeys through Garway.

Development
Sintel The Game will accept any .blend file put into its "Levels" folder as a level. It will be accessible from the game and can be played. Anyone who has Blender may make a level.

Sintel The Game uses a large number of Python scripts to control AIs, run the Level Manager and save the character's position. A few of these scripts are based upon some Python coded for the Blender Foundation open game Yo Frankie!, but the majority is coded either as a Blender feature or by the Sintel The Game team.

Sintel The Game (including all images, models and logic) is under the Creative Commons License Attribution 3.0 Unported except for all the Python code which is under the GNU GPL.

See also
 List of open source games

References

External links

 

Action-adventure games
Creative Commons-licensed video games
Python (programming language)-scripted video games
Windows games
Single-player video games
Classic Mac OS games
Linux games
Video games based on films